Syd or SYD may refer to:

Syd (name), including a list of people with the name
 Syd., taxonomic author abbreviation of Hans Sydow (1879–1946), German mycologist
 Sydney, New South Wales, Australia
 IATA code for Sydney Airport, New South Wales, Australia
 Syd the platypus, a mascot of the Sydney 2000 Olympic games.
 Sydney FC, professional soccer club
 Syd (singer), an American singer-songwriter
 National Rail station code for Sydenham railway station (London), London, England
 Stonewall Young Democrats, a young gay democratic club based out of Los Angeles, California
 Hans Sydow (1879-1946), a German mycologist with author abbreviation "Syd." 
 Sum-of-Years' Digits, an accounting, economics, and financial depreciation method
 Saw You Drown
 Seitokai Yakuindomo, a Japanese manga and anime series by Tozen Ujiie.

See also
 Sydney (disambiguation)
 Sid (disambiguation)